The 41st SIGNIS Sri Lanka Salutation Awards Ceremony 2018 festival (Sinhala: 41 වැනි සිග්නීස් සම්මාන උලෙළ), presented by the SIGNIS, was held to honor the cinema and television in Sri Lanka on August 25, 2018, at the Bandaranaike Memorial International Conference Hall, Colombo, Sri Lanka. His Eminence, Malcolm Cardinal Ranjith, Archbishop of Colombo, Sri Lanka was the chief guest at the awards night. Theme for the Salutation Ceremony was "The Proud Display of Youth Vitality in the Global Motion Picture Discourse".

In the ceremony, 26 films and 18 teledramas were nominated for the awards and three Signis International Awards were presented for actress Kanthi Lanka, Sumana Amarasinghe and film conservator and producer Tissa Nagodavithana. Signis Prize Awards were presented on the occasion of the 30th anniversary for the Rev. Fr. Marceline Jayakody.

Film Awards

Best Awards
 Next Aspiring Director – Roshan Edward
 Creative Merit Evaluation Certificates – Saheli Sadithma (Bandhanaya) & Dhanuka Dilshan (Dharmayuddhaya)
 Creative Coloring – Dinindu Jagoda (Sulanga Gini Aran)
 Creative Sound Combination – Priyantha Kaluarachchi and Alexandre Isubit (Nimnayaka Hudekalawa)
 Creative Animation – Buddhika Wijeratne, Chaminda Watawalawithana, Siddhartha Nayanananda (Bandhanaya)
 Creative Costume Designer – Jayantha Ranawaka (Aloko Udapadi)
 Creative Music Direction – Lakshman Joseph de Saram (Sulanga Gini Aran)
 Creative Cinematic Singer – Rosita Jesudasan (Nimnayaka Hudekalawa)
 Creative Lyricist – Sunil Ariyaratne (Premaya Nam)
 Creative Art Director – Lal Harendranath (Swaroopa)
 Creative Cinematographer – Channa Deshapriya (Nimnayaka Hudekalawa)
 Creative Editor – Chandana Prasanna and Udara Weeraratne (Nimnayaka Hudekalawa)
 Creative Script Writer – Kalpana Ariyawansa and Vindana Ariyawansa (Premaya Nam)
 Creative Supportive Actor – Kumara Thirimadura (Dharmayuddhaya)
 Creative Supportive Actress – Suranga Ranawaka (Premaya Nam)
 Creative Best Actor – Jackson Anthony (Dharmayuddhaya)
 Creative Best Actress – Samanalee Fonseka (Premaya Nam)
 Creative Direction – Vimukthi Jayasundara (Sulanga Gini Aran)
 Creative Best Film – Kalpana Ariyawansa and Vindana Ariyawansa (Premaya Nam)

Jury Special Awards
 Award for Editing: Saman Elvitigala – Sulanga Gini Aran
 Award for Acting: Saumya Liyanage – Nimnayaka Hudekalawa
 Award for Directing: Udayakantha Warnasuriya – Bandhanaya
 Award for Cinema Production: Thusitha Jayasena – Aloko Udapadi

Future Aspiring Directors Evaluation
 Chathra Weeraman – Aloko Udapadi
 Kalpana Ariyawansa and Vindana Ariyawansa – Premaya Nam
 Thisara Imbulana – Nino Live
 Priyantha Pathirage – Punchi Apith Baya Na Dan
 Rohan Perera – Heena Hoyana Samanallu
 Tissa Dias – Sellam Nethnam Lellam
 Sujeewa Gunaratne – Kaala
 Nihal Bandara – Seema Na Akase

Teledrama Awards

Best Awards
 Creative Costume Designer – Pushpakumara Bandaragama (Diyamankada)
 Creative Music Director – Samantha Perera (See Raja)
 Creative Male Singer – Navaratne Gamage (See Raja)
 Creative Female Singer – Indika Upamali (See Raja)
 Creative Lyricist – Jackson Anthony (See Raja)
 Creative Art Diretor – Dharmakeerthi Wickramathilake (Diyamankada)
 Creative Cinematographer – Vishwajith Karunaratne (See Raja)
 Creative Script Writer – Aruna Premaratne (Badde Kulawamiya)
 Creative Best Supporting Actor – Ananda Kumara Unnehe (Badde Kulawamiya)
 Creative Best Supporting Actress – Chandani Seneviratne (Badde Kulawamiya)
 Creative Best Actor – Mahendra Perera (Badde Kulawamiya)
 Creative Best Actor – Nadee Kammalweera (Badde Kulawamiya)
 Creative Best Director – Ananda Abeynayake (Badde Kulawamiya)
 Creative Best Teledrama – Fahim Maujud (Badde Kulawamiya)

Jury Special Awards
 Creative Talent Excellency (Children): Senulya Danthanarayana – See Raja
 Creative Talent Excellency: Bimsara Premaratne – Badde Kulawamiya
 Creative Talent Excellency: Isuri Devapriya – Diyamankada
 Creative Talent Excellency: Viranga Ketaperachchi – Praana
 Special Jury Award (Direction): Jackson Anthony – See Raja

References

2018 film awards
SIGNIS
Signis